Udaya Srinivas Gavara, popularly known as Bunny Vasu, is an Indian film producer who produces Telugu films. He is a partner of GA2 Pictures, a production company which he co-founded with Allu Aravind.  His films have included Bhale Bhale Magadivoy, Geetha Govindam and 100% Love. He also was the co-producer for the films Sarrainodu and Naa Peru Surya, Naa Illu India.

Early life and career
Bunny Vas was born in Palakollu in West Godavari district. He started off as an employee in Geetha Arts, eventually working alongside Allu Aravind. Working with Vamsi of UV Creations, he has distributed 57 films for Guntur and West Godavari regions, including Pokiri, Arya, and Magadheera. He was also the distributor for the film Gabbar Singh.

Aravind and Allu Arjun later made him a partner in GA2 Pictures, which is a subsidiary of Geetha Arts.

Filmography

References

External links

1981 births
Living people
Indian film producers
Telugu film producers
People from Palakollu
Film producers from Andhra Pradesh